De Corpo e Alma  is a 2010 Mozambican documentary film.

Synopsis 
The film tells the story of Victoria, Mariana and Vasco, three physically disabled young Mozambicans that live on the outskirts of Maputo. On a daily basis, they must face an endless list of physical, physiological and emotional obstacles that they each find a solution to in their own way by means of work, other activities and their attitude. The film explores the way they see other people and themselves. It poses such universal questions such as accepting oneself and how to find one's place in society.

Awards 
 30th URTI Grand Prix - URTI Grand Prix for Best Documentary, Monaco.
 SIGNIS Commendation Award - Zanzibar International Film Festival, Tanzania.
 Glauber Rocha Award - 38th Jornada Internacional de Cinema da Bahia, Brazil (2011).
 Best Documentary Award: Category Human Rights - Docudays UA, Ukraine.
 Most Influential Film of the Festival Award - Chashama Film Festival, United States of America.

References

See also
 Cinema of Mozambique
 Cinema of Africa

External links 

2010 films
Mozambican documentary films
2010 documentary films
Documentary films about children with disability